Sebree is a town in Kentucky, United States.

Sebree may also refer to:

Edmund Sebree (1898–1966), a general in the United States Army
Frank P. Sebree (1854–1940), American lawyer and politician
Mac Sebree (1932–2010), an American journalist and publisher
Uriel Sebree (1848–1922), an admiral in the United States Navy
Sebree, Missouri, a community in the United States
Sebree Island, an Alaskan island named in honor of Uriel Sebree
Sebree Peak, an Alaskan mountain named in honor of Uriel Sebree